Protohydnum is a genus of fungi in the order Auriculariales. Protohydnum cartilagineum, the type and only species, occurs in Central and South America and produces effused, cartilaginous basidiocarps (fruit bodies) on wood, yellow-ochre and wholly covered in small spines. Molecular research, based on cladistic analysis of DNA sequences, has shown that the genus is distinct, but that other species previously referred to Protohydnum belong in the genera Hyalodon or Elmerina.

References

Auriculariales
Basidiomycota genera
Taxa described in 1895
Fungi of South America